Herdorf is a town in the district of Altenkirchen, in Rhineland-Palatinate, Germany. It is situated on the river Heller, approx. 20 km south-west of Siegen.

Twin towns — sister cities
Herdorf is twinned with:

  Saint-Laurent-du-Pont, France (1982)

References

Towns in Rhineland-Palatinate
Altenkirchen (district)